Pela Commodities, whose complete name is Pela Commodities Limited (PCL), is a Ugandan company that buys, processes, packages and markets agricultural grain products nationally and to neighboring countries in the area of the African Great Lakes. The company's headquarters and processing factory are located in the city of Soroti.

Location
The company headquarters and main factory are located in Soroti Industrial Park, in Arapai sub-county, Soroti District, near the town of Soroti, adjacent to Soroti Fruit Processing Factory. The geographical coordinates of the company headquarters and processing factory are: 01°46'24.0"N, 33°37'03.0"E (Latitude:1.773333; Longitude:33.617500).

Overview
In 2021, a group of four entrepreneurs decided to establish an agro-processing plant in the city of Soroti, in Uganda's Eastern Region. The factory was constructed on land availed by the Uganda Investment Authority, in Arapai Industrial Park, on the outskirts of Soroti. One of the four investors is Amos Wekesa, whose primarily investments are in Uganda's hospitality industry. Soroti was selected because grains are extensively grown in the Teso sub-region and the city is within easy accessibility of the two major markets of Kenya and South Sudan.

The factory is capable of cleaning, sorting, drying and packaging up to 56 different types of grain. At maximum utilization, it is expected to process up to 600 metric tonnes of grain in 24 hours.

Ownership
The ownership of the company and factory is as depicted in the table below:

References

External links
 Tourism to agro-processing: How entrepreneur Wekesa turned Covid-19 into an investment opportunity As of 5 January 2021.
 All set for Uganda’s first Aflatoxin Removal Machine As of 3 February 2022.

Food manufacturers of Uganda
Companies established in 2021
Soroti
Soroti District
Eastern Region, Uganda
2021 establishments in Uganda 
Food and drink companies established in 2021